Yad Vashem (literally, "a memorial and a name") is Israel's official memorial to the victims of the Holocaust. It is dedicated to preserving the memory of the Jews who were murdered; echoing the stories of the survivors; honoring Jews who fought against their Nazi oppressors and Gentiles who selflessly aided Jews in need; and researching the phenomenon of the Holocaust in particular and genocide in general, with the aim of avoiding such events in the future. Yad Vashem's vision, as stated on its website, is: "To lead the documentation, research, education and commemoration of the Holocaust, and to convey the chronicles of this singular Jewish and human event to every person in Israel, to the Jewish people, and to every significant and relevant audience worldwide."

The memorial consists of a  complex containing two types of facilities: some dedicated to the scientific study of the Holocaust, and memorials and museums catering to the needs of the larger public. Among the former there are an International  Research Institute for Holocaust Research, an archives, a library, a publishing house and the International School for Holocaust Studies; the Holocaust History Museum, memorial sites such as the Children's Memorial and the Hall of Remembrance, the Museum of Holocaust Art, sculptures, outdoor commemorative sites such as the Valley of the Communities, as well as a synagogue.

A core goal of Yad Vashem's founders was to recognize non-Jews who, at personal risk and without a financial or evangelistic motive, chose to save Jews from the ongoing genocide during the Holocaust. Those recognized by Israel as Righteous Among the Nations are honored in a section of Yad Vashem known as the Garden of the Righteous Among the Nations.

Yad Vashem is the second-most-visited Israeli tourist site, after the Western Wall, with approximately one million visitors each year. It charges no admission fee.

Etymology
The name "Yad Vashem" is taken from a verse in the Book of Isaiah (56:5):
"[To] them will I give in my house and within my walls a [memorial] and a [name], better than sons and daughters; I will give them an everlasting [name], that shall not be cut off [from memory]."
 ). Naming the Holocaust memorial "yad vashem" (yād wā-šêm, literally "a memorial and a name") conveys the idea of establishing a national depository for the names of Jewish victims who have no one to carry their name after death. The original verse referred to eunuchs who, although they could not have children, could still live for eternity with the Lord.

History

The desire to establish a memorial in the historical Jewish homeland for Jewish victims of the Nazi Holocaust originated during World War II, in response to emerging accounts of the mass murder of Jews in Nazi-occupied countries. Yad Vashem was first proposed in September 1942, at a board meeting of the Jewish National Fund, by Mordecai Shenhavi, a member of Kibbutz Mishmar Ha'emek. In August 1945, the plan was discussed in greater detail at a Zionist meeting in London. A provisional board of Zionist leaders was established that included David Remez as chairman, Shlomo Zalman Shragai, Baruch Zuckerman, and Shenhavi. In February 1946, Yad Vashem opened an office in Jerusalem and a branch office in Tel Aviv, and in June that year convened its first plenary session. In July 1947, the First Conference on Holocaust Research was held at the Hebrew University of Jerusalem. However, the outbreak of the 1947–1949 Palestine war brought operations to a standstill for two years.

On 19 August 1953, the Knesset, Israel's Parliament, unanimously passed the Yad Vashem Law, establishing the Holocaust Martyrs' and Heroes' Remembrance Authority, the aim of which was "the commemoration in the Homeland of all those members of the Jewish people who gave their lives, or rose up and fought the Nazi enemy and its collaborators," and to set up "a memorial to them, and to the communities, organizations and institutions that were destroyed because they belonged to the Jewish people."

On 29 July 1954, the cornerstone for the Yad Vashem building was laid on a hill in western Jerusalem, to be known as the Mount of Remembrance; the organization had already begun projects to collect the names of individuals killed in the Holocaust; acquire Holocaust documentation and personal testimonies of survivors for the Archives and Library; and develop research and publications. The memorial and museum opened to the public in 1957.

The location of Yad Vashem on the western side of Mount Herzl - an area devoid of weighty historical associations, distinct from the Chamber of the Holocaust, founded in 1948 on Mount Zion - was chosen because it was far from the Jerusalem city center, and the founders of the memorial site didn't want to erect a grim, sorrowful memorial, amidst population concentration. The conceptual connection of "From Holocaust to Rebirth" was made only with hindsight: Only in 2003 the Connecting Path between Yad Vashem and the National Cemetery in Mount Herzl was created and paved. The "Valley of the Communities" monument at Yad Vashem commemorates over 5,000 Jewish communities destroyed or damaged during the Holocaust, the names of which are engraved on its towering walls. The position of Yad Vashem is that the Holocaust is incomparable to any other calamity previously inflicted on the Jewish people, and therefore the Holocaust cannot be regarded as a continuation of the death and destruction that plagued Jewish communities over the centuries, but rather as a unique phase in history, an unprecedented endeavor to totally annihilate the Jewish people.

In 1982, Yad Vashem sponsored the International Conference on Holocaust and Genocide, which included six presentations on the Armenian genocide. It later withdrew from the conference after threats by the Turkish government that Jewish lives would be put in danger if the conference went ahead.

On 15 March 2005, a new Museum complex four times larger than the old one opened at Yad Vashem. It included the Holocaust History Museum with a new Hall of Names, a Museum of Holocaust Art, an Exhibitions Pavilion, a Learning Center and a Visual Center. The new Yad Vashem museum was designed by Israeli-Canadian architect Moshe Safdie, replacing the previous 30-year-old exhibition. It was the culmination of a $100 million decade-long expansion project.

Administration
In November 2008, Rabbi Yisrael Meir Lau was appointed chairman of Yad Vashem's council, replacing Tommy Lapid. The vice chairman of the council is Moshe Kantor. Yitzhak Arad was vice chairman until his death on May 6, 2021. Elie Wiesel was vice chairman of the council until his death on 2 July 2016.

Yitzhak Arad served as the chairman of the directorate from 1972 to 1993. He was succeeded by Avner Shalev, who served as chairman until February 2021. Shalev was succeeded as chairman by Dani Dayan in August 2021.

The members of the Yad Vashem directorate are Yossi Ahimeir, Daniel Atar, Michal Cohen, Avraham Duvdevani, Boleslaw (Bolek) Goldman, Vera H. Golovensky, Shlomit Kasirer, Yossi Katribas, Yehiel Leket, Dalit Stauber, Zehava Tanne, Shoshana Weinshall, and Dudi Zilbershlag. Former deceased members were Matityahu Drobles, Moshe Ha-Elion and Baruch Shub.

The CEO is Tzvika Fayirizen. The Director of the International Institute for Holocaust Research is Dr. Iael Nidam-Orvieto. The chair for Holocaust studies is Dan Michman. Prof. Yehuda Bauer and Prof. Dina Porat are Senior Academic Advisors. Prof. Porat also served as Chief Historian between the years 2011-2022.

Objectives

The aims of Yad Vashem are education, research and documentation, and commemoration. Yad Vashem organizes professional development courses for educators both in Israel and throughout the world; develops age-appropriate study programs, curricula, and educational materials for Israeli and foreign schools in order to teach students of all ages about the Holocaust; holds exhibitions about the Holocaust; collects the names of Holocaust victims; collects photos, documents, and personal artifacts; and collects Pages of Testimony memorializing victims of the Holocaust. Yad Vashem seeks to preserve the memory and names of the six million Jews murdered during the Holocaust, and the numerous Jewish communities destroyed during that time. It holds ceremonies of remembrance and commemoration; supports Holocaust research projects; develops and coordinates symposia, workshops, and international conferences; and publishes research, memoirs, documents, albums, and diaries related to the Holocaust. Yad Vashem also honors non-Jews who risked their lives to save Jews during the Holocaust.

The International Institute for Holocaust Studies at Yad Vashem, founded in 1993, offers guides and seminars for students, teachers, and educators, and develops pedagogic tools for use in the classroom. Yad Vashem trains thousands domestic and foreign teachers every year.  

Yad Vashem operates a web site in several languages, including English, German, Hebrew, Persian, French,  Russian, Spanish and Arabic. In 2013 Yad Vashem launched an online campaign in Arabic, promoting Yad Vashem's website. The campaign reached over 2.4 million Arabic speakers from around the globe, and the traffic to Yad Vashem's website was tripled.

The institution's policy is that the Holocaust "cannot be compared to any other event". In 2009 Yad Vashem fired a docent for comparing the trauma Jews suffered in the Holocaust to the trauma Palestinians suffered during 1947–1949 Palestine war, including the Deir Yassin massacre.

Yad Vashem Studies

Yad Vashem Studies is a peer-reviewed semi-annual scholarly journal on the Holocaust. Published since 1957, it appears in both English and Hebrew editions.

Museum

Yad Vashem building on the Mount of Remembrance was inaugurated in 1957. Its first exhibits, opened on 1958, focused on documentation of the Holocaust. The second exhibition, opened in 1959, presented paintings from the Holocaust Ghettos and camps.

In 1993, planning began for a larger, more technologically advanced museum to replace the old one. The new building, designed by Canadian-Israeli architect Moshe Safdie, consists of a long corridor connected to 10 exhibition halls, each dedicated to a different chapter of the Holocaust. The museum combines the personal stories of 90 Holocaust victims and survivors and presents approximately 2,500 personal items including artwork and letters donated by survivors and others. The old historical displays revolving around anti-Semitism and the rise of Nazism have been replaced by exhibits that focus on the personal stories of Jews killed in the Holocaust. According to Avner Shalev, the museum's curator and chairman, a visit to the new museum revolves around "looking into the eyes of the individuals. There weren't six million victims, there were six million individual murders."

The new museum was dedicated on 15 March 2005 in the presence of leaders from 40 states and then Secretary General of the UN Kofi Annan. President of Israel Moshe Katzav said that Yad Vashem serves as "an important signpost to all of humankind, a signpost that warns how short the distance is between hatred and murder, between racism and genocide".

In April 2019, Yad Vashem started a new collection center to house and conserve millions of artifacts from the Holocaust.

Architecture

The first architect involved in the design of Yad Vashem was Munio Weinraub, who worked on the project from 1943 till the 1960s, together with his architectural partner Al Mansfield. He was approached for this purpose by Mordechai Shenhavi, the initiator and first director of the institution. Weinraub's plans were not realised as a whole, but some of his ideas are visible in Yad Vashem today.

The new Holocaust History Museum, designed by Moshe Safdie, is shaped like a triangular concrete prism that cuts through the landscape, illuminated by a  skylight. Visitors follow a preset route that takes them through underground galleries that branch off from the main hall. Safdie is also the architect behind the Children's Memorial and the Deportees (cattle-car) Memorial.

The gates are the work of the sculptor David Palombo (1920–1966).

Hall of Names

The Hall of Names is a memorial to the six million Jews who were murdered in the Holocaust. The main hall is composed of two cones: one ten meters high, with a reciprocal well-like cone excavated into the underground rock, its base filled with water. On the upper cone is a display featuring 600 photographs of Holocaust victims and fragments of Pages of Testimony. These are reflected in the water at the bottom of the lower cone, commemorating those victims whose names remain unknown. Surrounding the platform is the circular repository, housing the approximately 2.7 million Pages of Testimony collected to date, with empty spaces for those yet to be submitted.

Since the 1950s, Yad Vashem has collected approximately 110,000 audio, video, and written testimonies by Holocaust survivors. As the survivors age, the program has expanded to visiting survivors in their homes, to tape interviews. Adjoining the hall is a study area with a computerized data bank where visitors can do online searches for the names of Holocaust victims.

Archives
The Archive is the oldest department of Yad Vashem. Before presenting an exhibition, Yad Vashem collects items. The best known of these are the historical photographs, as well as the Pages of Testimonies collected from survivors. The latter is a database of personal information about those who survived and those who were murdered in the Holocaust. Yad Vashem has also acquired access to the database of the International Tracing Service of Bad Arolsen of the International Committee of the Red Cross, and these two databases complement each other for research purposes.

Righteous Among the Nations

One of Yad Vashem's tasks is to honor non-Jews who risked their lives, liberty, or positions to save Jews during the Holocaust. To this end, a special independent commission, headed by a retired Supreme Court justice, was established. The commission members, including historians, public figures, lawyers, and Holocaust survivors, examine and evaluate each case according to a well-defined set of criteria and regulations. The Righteous receive a certificate of honor and a medal, and their names are commemorated in the Garden of the Righteous Among the Nations, on the Mount of Remembrance, Yad Vashem. This is an ongoing project that will continue for as long as there are valid requests, substantiated by testimonies or documentation.

Yad Vashem's declared policy is not to provide meaningful recognition, even in a possible new category, to Jews who rescued Jews, regardless of the number of people their activism saved. The stated reason is that Jews had an obligation to save fellow Jews and do not deserve recognition.

Art gallery
Yad Vashem houses the world's largest collection of artwork produced by Jews and other victims of Nazi occupation in 1933–1945. The Yad Vashem Art Department supervises a 10,000-piece collection, adding 300 pieces a year, most of them donated by survivors' families or discovered in attics. Included in the collection are works by Alexander Bogen, Alice Lok Cahana, Samuel Bak, and Felix Nussbaum.

Monuments
The monument to the heroes of the Warsaw Ghetto Uprising by Nathan Rapoport, a version of the 1948 Monument to the Ghetto Heroes from Warsaw.
Janusz Korczak and the Children, memorial to the educator and the children he refused to leave
Memorial to the Jewish children murdered in the Holocaust
The Memorial to the Deportees, aka "train monument", in memory of the Jews taken to the extermination camps by cattle cars
Valley of the (Destroyed) Communities, in memory of the Jewish communities of Europe which ceased to exist after the Holocaust

Prizes awarded by Yad Vashem
Yad Vashem awards the following book prizes:
Yad Vashem Prize for Children's Holocaust Literature
Yad Vashem International Book Prize for Holocaust Research, established in 2011 in memory of Abraham Meir Schwartzbaum, Holocaust survivor, and his family who was murdered in the Holocaust. Since 2018 the prize is awarded in memory of Benny and Tilly Joffe z"l, Holocaust survivors, and their family who was murdered in the Holocaust. It is awarded annually in recognition of high scholarly research and writing on the Holocaust.
 Sussman Prize for Paintings of the Shoah. Recipients include:
 1996: Aharon Gluska and Moshe Kupferman
The annual Buchman Foundation Memorial Prize, for writers and scholars for Holocaust-related works. Recipients include:
2007: Hanoch Bartov, for Beyond the Horizon, Across the Street
2007: Shlomo Aronson, for Hitler, the Allies and the Jews
Earlier: Aharon Appelfeld, Alona Frankel (2005), Ida Fink, Dina Porat, Lizzie Doron, Amir Gutfreund, and Itamar Levin.

Awards bestowed upon Yad Vashem
In 1973, the Pinkas HaKehillot (Encyclopedia of Jewish Communities) project of Yad Vashem was awarded the Israel Prize, for its special contribution to society and the State.
In 2003, Yad Vashem was awarded the Israel Prize, for lifetime achievement and its special contribution to society and the State.
In September 2007, Yad Vashem received the Prince of Asturias Award for Concord. The Prince of Asturias Awards are presented in eight categories. The Award for Concord is bestowed upon a person, persons, or institution whose work has made an exemplary and outstanding contribution to mutual understanding and peaceful coexistence among men, to the struggle against injustice or ignorance, to the defense of freedom, or whose work has widened the horizons of knowledge or has been outstanding in protecting and preserving mankind's heritage.
On 25 October 2007, Yad Vashem Chairman Avner Shalev was awarded the Légion d'honneur for his "extraordinary work on behalf of Holocaust remembrance worldwide." French President Nicolas Sarkozy presented Shalev with the award in a special ceremony at the Élysée Palace.
In 2011, Shalev received the City of Jerusalem's Patron of Jerusalem Award in recognition of his work in the city.

Notable visitors

Heads of state

Presidents

 François Tombalbaye (1965)
 Luis Echeverría (1975)
 Anwar Sadat (1977)
 Richard von Weizsäcker (1985)
 Bill Clinton (1994)
 Emil Constantinescu (2000)
 Stjepan Mesić (2001)
 Horst Köhler (2005)
 Boris Tadić (2005)
 Vladimir Putin (2005)
 Lech Kaczyński (2006)
 George W. Bush (2008)
 Nicolas Sarkozy (2008)
 Paul Kagame (2008)
 Christian Wulff (2010)
 Ivo Josipović (2012)
 Joachim Gauck (2012)
 Barack Obama (2013)
 Tomislav Nikolić (2013)
 Nicos Anastasiades (2013)
 Juan Manuel Santos Calderón (2013)
 Miloš Zeman (2013)
 Goodluck Jonathan (2013)
 Bronisław Komorowski (2013)
 Otto Pérez Molina (2013)
 Mahinda Rajapaksa (2014)
 Traian Băsescu (2014)
 Ollanta Humala (2014)
 Pranab Mukherjee (2015)
 Kolinda Grabar-Kitarović (2015, 2019)
 Andrzej Duda (2017)
 Frank-Walter Steinmeier (2017)
 Donald Trump (2017)
 Rumen Radev (2018)
 Rodrigo Duterte (2018)
 Petro Poroshenko (2019)
 Volodymyr Zelensky (2020)
 Joe Biden (2022)

Prime Ministers (heads of government)
 
 Bob Hawke
 Tage Erlander
 Dawda Jawara (1966)
 Margaret Thatcher (1986)
 John Major (1990–97)
 Konstantinos Mitsotakis (1992)
 Sergey Tereshchenko (1992)
 Adolfas Šleževičius (1993)
 Jean Chrétien (2000)
 Ivo Sanader (2005)
 Recep Tayyip Erdoğan (2005)
 Angela Merkel (2006)
 Bidzina Ivanishvili (2013)
 Enrico Letta (2013)
 Antonis Samaras (2013)
 Mark Rutte (2013)
 Stephen Harper (2014)
 Bohuslav Sobotka (2014)
 Aleksandar Vučić (2014)
 Alexis Tsipras (2015)
 Edi Rama (2015)
 Shinzō Abe (2015)
 Andrej Plenković (2017)
 Narendra Modi (2017)
  Malcolm Turnbull (2017)

Royalty
 Prince Philip, Duke of Edinburgh (1994) 
 Queen Beatrix of the Netherlands (1995)
 Frederik, Crown Prince of Denmark (2013)
 Prince William, Duke of Cambridge (2018)

UN Secretary-Generals
  Kurt Waldheim
  Ban Ki-Moon
  António Guterres

Religious figures
 
 14th Dalai Lama (1994)
  Pope John Paul II (2000)
  Pope Benedict XVI (2009)
 Patriarch Kirill of Moscow (2012)
 Justin Welby (2013), Archbishop of Canterbury
  Pope Francis (2014)

Others
Marlene Dietrich, German-American actor
Branko Lustig, Croatian two-time Oscar winning producer and Holocaust survivor
  Wang Qishan, Vice President of China (2018)

See also
 Gathering the fragments
 International Holocaust Remembrance Day
 List of Israel Prize recipients
 List of Righteous Among the Nations by country
 The Holocaust History Project
 Yad Vashem: Preserving the Past to Ensure the Future
 Yom HaShoah

References

External links

  

 
1953 establishments in Israel
Organizations established in 1953
Museums established in 1953
Holocaust museums
History museums in Israel
Museums in Jerusalem
Monuments and memorials in Mount Herzl
Moshe Safdie buildings
Military and war museums in Israel
Mount Herzl
Israel Prize recipients that are organizations
Israel Prize for special contribution to society and the State recipients
Israel Prize for lifetime achievement & special contribution to society recipients